Andriuškevičius is a Lithuanian language surname.  Polish counterpart: Andruszkiewicz, Russian/Belarusian: Andryushkevich.  Notable people with the surname include:

Aleksas Andriuškevičius (born 1959), Lithuanian artist
Alfonsas Andriuškevičius (born 1940), Lithuanian poet and art historian
Gintaras Andriuškevičius (born 1975), Lithuanian race walker
Martynas Andriuškevičius (born 1986), Lithuanian basketball player who played in the National Basketball Association
Vytautas Andriuškevičius (born 1990), Lithuanian footballer

Lithuanian-language surnames